Gandhi Nagar is a village in the Nicobar district of Andaman and Nicobar Islands, India. It is located in the Great Nicobar tehsil.

Demographics 

According to the 2011 census of India, Gandhi Nagar has 13 households. The effective literacy rate (i.e. the literacy rate of population excluding children aged 6 and below) is 69.12%.

References 

Villages in Great Nicobar tehsil